Godfrey is a village in Madison County, Illinois, United States. The population was 17,825 at the 2020 census. Godfrey is located within the River Bend portion of the Greater St. Louis metropolitan area.

History
The village is named for Captain Benjamin Godfrey, a native New Englander, who arrived in the area in 1832. 1838 saw the establishment of the Monticello Female Seminary, later renamed Monticello College. Captain Godfrey, the father of eight daughters, was an advocate of higher education for women and made a large donation of funds and land for the college. Monticello operated as a two-year college for women until the campus was sold in 1970 to establish Lewis and Clark Community College. Monticello's final class graduated in 1971.

The nearby mouth of the Missouri River was the starting point for the expedition of Lewis and Clark.

Geography
Godfrey is located in the northwest corner of Madison County at  (38.948097, -90.202886). It is bordered to the southeast by the city of Alton, to the east by Foster Township, to the north and west by Jersey County, and to the south by the Mississippi River, across which is the city of West Alton, Missouri.

The southwestern edge of the village is a wall of  limestone bluffs along the Mississippi River. Godfrey retains the status of a village and is a mixture of small business, agriculture, and upper middle class housing developments.

Several highways cross the village. U.S. Route 67 passes through the village center, leading south into Alton and thence into Missouri, while to the north it leads  to Jerseyville. Illinois Route 3 passes through the southern part of the village, leading southeast into the north part of Alton and west  to Grafton. Illinois Route 100 follows the Mississippi River along the southern edge of the village, leading east into the center of Alton and west-northwest  to Grafton. Illinois Route 267 splits off from US 67 north of the village center and leads northeast  to Brighton. Finally, Illinois Route 255, a four-lane expressway, has its northern terminus at US 67 in Godfrey; it leads southeast  to Interstates 255 and 270 in Pontoon Beach.

Demographics

At the 2000 census there were 16,286 people, 6,427 households, and 4,698 families living in the village. The racial makeup of the village was 94.06% White, 4.04% African American, 0.31% Native American, 0.65% Asian, 0.01% Pacific Islander, 0.19% from other races, and 0.74% from two or more races. Hispanic or Latino of any race were 0.98%.

Of the 6,427 households 29.7% had children under the age of 18 living with them, 62.2% were married couples living together, 8.0% had a female householder with no husband present, and 26.9% were non-families. 23.3% of households were one person and 11.4% were one person aged 65 or older. The average household size was 2.46 and the average family size was 2.90.

The age distribution was 22.6% under the age of 18, 6.3% from 18 to 24, 26.8% from 25 to 44, 26.5% from 45 to 64, and 17.8% 65 or older. The median age was 42 years. For every 100 females, there were 95.6 males. For every 100 females age 18 and over, there were 92.1 males.

The median household income was $50,342 and the median family income  was $57,971. Males had a median income of $43,017 versus $27,870 for females. The per capita income for the village was $25,292. About 3.2% of families and 5.9% of the population were below the poverty line, including 5.1% of those under age 18 and 2.5% of those age 65 or over.

Notable people

 Zoe Akins, Pulitzer Prize-winning poet and playwright; attended school in Godfrey
 Craig Hentrich, NFL punter, 1994-2009
 John Madson, freelance naturalist, tallgrass prairie ecosystems
 Ellis Wainwright, brewer, art collector and socialite

References

External links

Villages in Madison County, Illinois
Villages in Illinois
Populated places established in 1832
Illinois populated places on the Mississippi River
1832 establishments in Illinois